NH Hotel Group is a Spanish multinational hotel company headquartered in Madrid, that operates over 350 hotels in 28 countries, currently under the Anantara, NH Collection, nhow Hotels, Tivoli, NH Hotels, Elewana Collection and Avani brands. The company is a subsidiary of a Thailand hotel group, Minors International.

Operations 

NH Hotel Group offers luxury and up-scale modernly-furnished hotels, located primarily in Europe and Latin America. The company also manages luxury venues such as the prestigious Casino de Madrid. NH Hotel Group ranks third in the European ranking for business hotels.

The group has 380 hotels in 29 countries with over 53,000 rooms.

History
NH ("Navarra Hoteles", named after the region in Spain) was founded in 1978 by Antonio Catalán. Throughout the 1980s, 1990s and 2000s, it made a series of acquisitions (Jolly in Italy, Krasnapolsky in the Netherlands, Astron in Germany) which increased its size to close to 400 hotels. In 2014, three brands were created to commercialize its properties: NH Hotels, NH Collection and nhow.

Corporate information 

NH Hotel Group is listed on the Madrid Stock Exchange, where the shares of NH Hotel Group is a constituent of the Madrid Stock Exchange General Index. The shares are also traded on the OTC Market.

Since 2018, NH Hotel Group is part of Minor Hotels of Thailand, which is one of the fastest growing hospitality companies. The group made a total revenue of approximately US$4.6 billion in 2019. Minor Hotels manages in total more than 530 hotels, resorts and branded residences across five continents, being currently the 13th biggest hotel chain world-wide. Currently, the group has 80 new hotels in the pipeline scheduled to be opened from 2020 to 2024. Minor encompasses a total of 8 hotel brands, from its flagship luxury brand Anantara Hotels, Resorts and Spas, which is known for its high quality standards and the prime locations of its properties, and other brands like Avani, NH Collection, NH Hotels, Tivoli, nhow, Oaks and Elewana.  The company also plans to launch a new luxury brand, M Collection, in 2021. 

Minor also has a portfolio of other related businesses such as private jets (M Jets), shopping malls, luxury cruises and spas. Minor Hotels is part of publicly listed Minor International (MINT), one of the largest hospitality and leisure companies in Asia. Minor International is also known for its international retail and lifestyle brands, and its subsidiary, Minor Food Group, is one of Asia's largest restaurant companies, with more than 2100 outlets. Some of the restaurant chains that the company owns, are the luxury restaurant chain Corbin & King, and others like The Coffee Club, Benihana, The Pizza Company, Thai Express, Tablafina, Seen Restaurants and M Beach Club. The company is represented on the Dow Jones Sustainability Emerging Markets Index.

Shareholders
, HNA Group was the largest shareholder with 29.34% of shares. However, after HNA Group acquired the competitor of NH Hotel Group, Carlson Rezidor Hotel Group, 4 directors of NH Hotel Group that were nominated by HNA Group were removed by the company in mid-2016.

Articles about hotels of the group
Doelen Hotel, Amsterdam, The Netherlands

References

Hotel chains in Spain
Companies based in Madrid
Hospitality companies established in 1978
Companies listed on the Madrid Stock Exchange
Spanish brands
HNA Group
Hospitality companies of Spain
Spanish companies established in 1978
Hotels established in 1978